Aric Hagberg is an American applied mathematician and academic, working in nonlinear dynamics, pattern formation and complex systems. He is the deputy division leader of the computer, computational, and statistical sciences division at Los Alamos National Laboratory.

He was educated at the University of Arizona (PhD, 1994).

Aric is also one of the authors of the NetworkX package.

References

External links
 Hagberg's Google Scholar Profile
 Hagberg's Page at LANL's Center for Nonlinear Studies

Living people
University of Arizona alumni
Los Alamos National Laboratory personnel
Year of birth missing (living people)